Davide Dionigi (born 10 January 1974) is an Italian football coach and a former player. He was most recently the manager of Serie B club Cosenza.

Career

Player 

Dionigi started his career at hometown club Modena and played 20 games in Serie B. He then signed by A.C. Milan and played on their youth team. He then transferred to Vicenza (Serie B), and in November 1993 left for Como. He won promotion with Como partially by his 14 goals. In summer 1994, he left for Reggiana of Serie A, but in November 1994 he left on loan back to Como, this time at Serie B. In summer 1995, he signed for his third Serie A team, A.C. Torino, due to Como's relegation. In summer 1996, he had to search club again, due to Torino relegation. This time, joined Reggina of Serie B. He won top-scorer that season, and he was signed by another Serie A team Fiorentina. He played his worst Serie A start, and moved to Piacenza in October 1998, where he played two seasons. In January 2000, Piacenza sent him to Sampdoria of Serie B, but they met again six months later, due to relegation of Piacenza and Sampdoria missed the chance to promote. In January 2001, he re-joined Reggina, this time at Serie A to avoid relegation. But Reggina relegated at last, but Dionigi was one of the players to help the club back to Series A just a year later. He was dropped from the club Serie A plan, and he joined former coach Franco Colomba at Napoli of Serie B on 31 August 2002. He played in Naples until the club went bankrupt two years later. Dionigi started his third spells at Reggio Calabria since 9 July 2004. After played another 10 Serie A games, he left on loan to Bari, Ternana, Spezia and lastly Crotone, all were Serie B clubs.

In summer 2007, he joined Taranto of Serie C1, where he last played since at Como 1993–94 season.

Manager 
Since 9 November 2010 until 26 June 2012 he has been the head coach of Taranto.

On 2 July 2012 he was named new head coach of Reggina.

On 24 June 2020 he was appointed at the helm of Serie B club Ascoli. He left the club by the end of the season after guiding them to safety.

On 10 December 2020 he joined Serie B club Brescia, as the third head coach of the season for the Rondinelle. He was removed from his coaching position less than two months later, on 3 February 2021.

On 17 June 2022 Dionigi was hired by Serie B club Cosenza on a one-year contract. He was dismissed on 31 October 2022, with Cosenza on sixteenth place in the league table.

Managerial statistics

Honours an awards
 Serie B Top-scorer: 1997
 Promotion through
 Serie B Third Place: 2002 (Reggina)
 Serie C1 playoffs winner: 1994 (Como)

References

External links
 Stats. at Taranto Sport (In Excel File) 
 National Stats. at FIGC  
 

1974 births
Living people
Italian footballers
Italy under-21 international footballers
Italy youth international footballers
Modena F.C. players
A.C. Milan players
L.R. Vicenza players
Como 1907 players
A.C. Reggiana 1919 players
Torino F.C. players
Reggina 1914 players
ACF Fiorentina players
Piacenza Calcio 1919 players
U.C. Sampdoria players
S.S.C. Napoli players
S.S.C. Bari players
Ternana Calcio players
Spezia Calcio players
F.C. Crotone players
Taranto F.C. 1927 players
S.S. Fidelis Andria 1928 players
Serie A players
Serie B players
Association football midfielders
Italian football managers
Reggina 1914 managers
Ascoli Calcio 1898 F.C. managers
Sportspeople from Modena
U.S. Catanzaro 1929 managers
Cosenza Calcio managers
Serie B managers
Serie C managers
Footballers from Emilia-Romagna